René Danesi (born 30 August 1947) is a French politician, elected a senator for Haut-Rhin in 2014.

Biography
Danesi studied at Sciences Po Strasbourg.

He was the mayor of Tagsdorf, Haut-Rhin from 1974 to 2017 as well as the 3rd vice-president of the Regional council of Alsace. A member of the UDI party, he was elected as a senator for Haut-Rhin on the list led by Catherine Troendlé on September 28th, 2014. He has sat within the UMP and The Republicans parliamentary groups. Between 2017 and 2018, Danesi was a member of the Parliamentary Assembly of the Council of Europe.

Dabesi supported candidate Nicolas Sarkozy in the open primary of the right and centre in 2016. Then he supported Laurent Wauquiez in the 2017 The Republicans leadership election which Wauquiez won.

References

External links
 M. René Danesi, French Senate official website 
 René Danesi, NosSénateurs.fr 

Mayors of places in Grand Est
Regional councillors of France
French Senators of the Fifth Republic
Senators of Haut-Rhin
Union for a Popular Movement politicians
The Republicans (France) politicians
1947 births
Living people